Ellis Narrington Burton (August 12, 1936 – October 1, 2013) was an American professional baseball center fielder who played for the St. Louis Cardinals, Cleveland Indians and Chicago Cubs over parts of five Major League Baseball (MLB) seasons. He was born in Los Angeles, California.

He was selected in the Rule 5 draft by the Houston Colt .45s from the Toronto Maple Leafs on November 26, .

Burton posted a .216 average with 17 home runs and 59 runs batted in in 215 Major League games, scoring 79 runs while stealing six bases.

During an eleven-year minor league career, he hit .274 and 169 home runs in 1,213 games, while playing from 1955 through 1965 for 10 different teams at four different levels.

References

External links

1936 births
2013 deaths
African-American baseball players
Baseball players from Los Angeles
Billings Mustangs players
Chicago Cubs players
Cleveland Indians players
Fort Worth Cats players
Houston Buffaloes players
Louisville Colonels (minor league) players
Omaha Cardinals players
Rochester Red Wings players
St. Louis Cardinals players
Salt Lake City Bees players
Toronto Maple Leafs (International League) players
Tri-City Braves players
Place of death missing
20th-century African-American sportspeople
21st-century African-American people